The Hang Jebat Stadium is a multi-purpose stadium with a capacity of 40,000 people in Krubong/Paya Rumput, Malacca, Malaysia. It was completed in September 2004 and named after a Malacca Sultanate Laksamana, Hang Jebat. The stadium was the home for Melaka United F.C. and is currently used mostly for football matches. In 2010, it became the main venue for the Sukma Games. During qualification for the 2018 FIFA World Cup, the Syria national football team played many of its home matches there due to the Syrian Civil War.

Gallery

See also 
 Sport in Malaysia
 Hang Tuah Stadium
 List of football stadiums in Malaysia

References

External links 

 Melaka Stadium Corporation Website

Football venues in Malaysia
Athletics (track and field) venues in Malaysia
Multi-purpose stadiums in Malaysia
Sports venues in Melaka
2004 establishments in Malaysia
Melaka United F.C.